Amnirana parkeriana, commonly known as Congolo frog, or Parker's white-lipped frog, is a species of frog in the family Ranidae. It is endemic to Angola.

Its natural habitats are subtropical or tropical moist lowland forests and swamps.

References

parkeriana
Frogs of Africa
Amphibians of Angola
Endemic fauna of Angola
Amphibians described in 1938
Taxa named by Robert Mertens
Taxonomy articles created by Polbot